Bilha Chepchirchir (born 13 October 1990) is a Kenyan female volleyball player. She was part of the Kenya women's national volleyball team.

She participated in the 2010 FIVB Volleyball Women's World Championship.
 She played with Blue Triangle.

Clubs
  Blue Triangle (2010)

References

External links
http://www.fivb.org/EN/Volleyball/Competitions/WorldChampionships/2010/Women/viewPressRelease.asp?No=24062

1990 births
Living people
Kenyan women's volleyball players